This is the list of notable people who were born, lived or grew up in Mansehra.

 Mahan Singh Mirpuri (famous Sikh Khalsa Army General, Mansehra derives its name from him)  
 Abdul Hakeem Khan Swati(Governor KPK
 Azam Khan Swati ( Senator and Federal Minister)
 Abrar Ahmed Swati ( Pakistani Cricketer)
 Sagar Sarhadi ( Indian Writer and Bollywood movies producer + director) 
 Muhammad Farid Khan Tanoli ( Nawab of Amb state)
 Waji-Uz-Zaman Khan( Chief of Swati )
 Abdul Karim Saeed Pasha
Haris Rauf Swati (Pakistani Cricketer)
 Ahmed Hussain Shah
 Azam Khan Swati
 Babar Saleem Swati (MPA)
 Reham Khan Swati (BBC Journalist)
 Bashir Jehangiri Swati  ( Chief Justice of Pakistan)
 Chaudhry Aslam Khan
 Laiq Muhammad Swati (MPA)
 Ghulam Ghaus Hazarvi
 Ghulam Ur Rehman
 Haroon Khan Badshah
 Ibrar Hussain
 Jamal J. Elias

 Maliha Ali Asghar Khan
 Mian Zia ur Rehman
 Muhammad Raza Khan
 Muhammad Safdar Awan
 Muhammad Sajjad Awan
 Muneeb-ur-Rehman
 Qari Fayyaz-ur-Rehman Alvi
 Saleh Muhammad Khan Swati (MNA)
 Sardar Muhammad Yousuf
 Sardar Shahjahan Yousuf
 Sardar Zahoor Ahmad

 Khan Khudadad Khan Swati( Ex-Minister of health West Pakistan)

References 

Mansehra District